Slovakia first participated at the European Youth Olympic Festival at the 1993 Summer Festival and has earned medals at both summer and winter festivals.

Medal tables

Medals by Summer Youth Olympic Festival

Medals by Winter Youth Olympic Festival

Medals by summer sport

Medals by winter sport

List of medalists

Summer Festivals

Winter Festivals

See also
 Slovakia at the Youth Olympics
 Slovakia at the Olympics
 Slovakia at the Paralympics
 Slovakia at the European Games
 Slovakia at the Universiade
 Slovakia at the World Games

References
 EYOF - Slovak Olympic Committee

Youth sport in Slovakia
Nations at the European Youth Olympic Festival
Slovakia at multi-sport events